Dundon is a surname. Notable people with the surname include:

Bill Dundon (born 1934), American bobsledder
Ed Dundon (1859–1893), American baseball player
Gus Dundon (1874–1940), American baseball player
Kevin Dundon, Irish chef
Michael Dundon (1854–1936), Maltese politician
Thomas Dundon (born 1972), American businessman